Lutjanus fulviflamma,  the dory snapper, blackspot snapper, black-spot sea perch, finger-mark bream, long-spot snapper, Moses perch or red bream, is a species of marine ray-finned fish belonging to the family Lutjanidae, the snappers. It has a wide Indo-Pacific distribution.

Taxonomy 
Lutjanus fulviflamma was first formally described in 1775 as Sciaena fulviflamma by the Swedish speaking Finnish born explorer and naturalist Peter Forsskål with the type locality given as the Red Sea. The specific name, fulviflamma, is a compound of fulvus which means “brownish yellow”, although it is frequently used to mean just yellow, and flamma which means “fire”. The name was not explained but may be a reference to the vivid yellow upper body and tail which is visible on some individuals.

Description
Lutjanus fulviflamma has a body which varies in shape from moderately deep to relatively slender with a standard length  which is 2.5 to 2.9 times its depth, with a head which is not very steeply sloped. The incision and the knob on the preoperculum are not well developed. The vomerine teeth may be arranged in a triangular patch with a posterior extension or in a rhombus and there is a patch of grain-like teeth on the tongue. The dorsal fin has 10 spines and 12-14 soft rays while the anal fin contains 3 spines and 8 soft rays. The rear part of the dorsal and anal fins vary in shape from rounded to rather angular. The pectoral fins contain 15 to 17 rays and the caudal fin can be truncate or slightly emarginate. This snapper has a pale coloured body marked with 5-7 narrow yellow horizontal stripes of equal width on the flanks, the longest of these extends through the eye on to the snout. There is a quadrilateral black spot on the lateral line three-quarters of the distance between the head and the caudal fin.

Distribution and habitat
Lutjanus fulviflamma has a wide Indo Pacific distribution. It occurs in the Red Sea from the Gulf of Suez and Gulf of Aqaba south along the eastern African coast as far south as eastern South Africa and eastwards through the Indian Ocean, including the Persian Gulf, into the Pacific Ocean as far easy as Samoa. They reach as far north as the Ryukyu Islands of southern Japan and south to northern Australia. There is also a single record from the Mediterranean Sea, from Malta, which had an eastern African origin as phylogenetic analysis showed. 

Biology
Lutjanus fulviflamma frequently forms large mixed species schools with the bluestripe snapper (Lutjanus kasmira) and the bigeye snapper (Lutjanus lutjanus) as adults. They are predators which feed on fishes and crustaceans. Off eastern Africa and New Caledonia spawning takes place in the Spring and Summer from August to March. In the western Indian Ocean there is an extended spawning period from November and December to April and May. They are discontinuous spawners in which the females lay between 51,000 and 460,000 eggs in batches during a season, although batch sizes have yet to be ascertained.

Fisheries
Lutjanus fulviflamma is a common target species for subsistence fisheries and frequently appears in fish markets, typically fresh. It is caught mostly with handlines, traps and gill nets. In the Persian Gulf this species is particularly important in Abu Dhabi as part of the Emirates coastal demersal fishery and is taken utilising intertidal fence nets and dome shaped wire traps. The dory snapper is also targeted as an important commercial quarry in the inshore waters of Tanzania.

References

External links 
 Itis.org
 Animaldiversity Web
 WoRMS
 

fulviflamma
Fish of the Indian Ocean
Fish of the Red Sea
Marine fauna of East Africa
Marine fish of Australia
Fish described in 1775
Taxa named by Peter Forsskål